A patent is a set of rights granted by a government to an inventor.

Patent may also refer to:
 Letters patent, a type of legal instrument issued by a monarch or president
 Land patent, a land grant, such as in a patented mining claim
 Patent leather, a shiny form of leather
 Patent medicine, a medical compound of questionable effectiveness
 Patent bet, in the UK, a type of wager
 A botanical term

See also 
 Plant Patent Act, legislation allowing plant breeds to be patented in the United States